Corey Smith (born October 3, 1977) is a contemporary American painter, sculptor, photographer, professional snowboarder, and snowboard designer. Smith was the art director at COMUNE, curator and founder of their Drop City artist collective (which he is no longer a part of), and a contributing artist for CAPiTA Snowboards. In addition, Smith founded the snowboard company Spring Break Snowboards.

Biography
Corey Smith was born in San Francisco, California. In 1996, he graduated from Canby High School, and in 2006, Smith graduated from Pacific Northwest College of Art with a Bachelor of Fine Arts in Graphic Design and Photography.

Career

Snowboarding
Corey Smith began snowboarding at the age of 16, at his home mountain Mount Hood Meadows. From 2003 to 2006 Smith coached at Windells Snowboard Camp. Smith has appeared in several notable snowboarding feature films such as, Neoproto (2003, Neoproto Films), Everyday Something (2004, Neoproto Films), Some Kinda Life (2005, Neoproto Films), Love/Hate (2005 Kids Know Productions). During Smith's professional snowboarding he was sponsored by Capita snowboards, Holden, Flux, Electric, ThirtyTwo, Grenade. He has been featured in interviews and editorial photos in several international snowboarding magazines such as, Transworld Snowboarding (USA), Snowboarder Magazine (USA), Snowboard Magazine (USA), Future Snowboard (USA), Frequency: The Snowboarder's Journal, Method (Europe), Onboard (Europe), Desillusion (France), Snowboard Canada (Canada), Transfer (New Zealand), Arkade (Utah, USA).

In early 2010 he designed and created hand-crafted avant garde snowboard shapes inspired by vintage surf boards. This experiment in contemporary snowboard design was entitled Spring Break Snowboards.

Art
Smith early artwork was influenced by his involvement in snowboarding and skateboarding culture. His first solo exhibition was at KCDC in Brooklyn, NY. He has been contributing artwork and graphics for CAPiTA Snowboards for over ten years. Graphics for Birdhouse Skateboards pro skateboarder Ragdoll. promodel bindings for Flux. Smith has been featured in FHM, Maxim, Mean, Complex, Nylon Guys. Smith's first European show is at the Vans Wängl Tängl 2012 in Mayrhofen.

Art exhibitions

Solo exhibitions

2016
One Grand Gallery, "A Smile is a Dream My Heart Makes", Portland, OR
Nemo Design, "Slush Slashers and Powder Racers", Portland, OR 
2015
Paul Loya Gallery, "The Church of Quantum Interconnectedness", Culver City, CA 
2013
Backspace Gallery, "End Your Pain", Portland, OR 
2011
 AR4T Gallery, "Become a Better You", Laguna Beach, CA
 Coral Canyon Gallery, "Red Dot Art Fair" – Miami, FL
2010
 Worksound Gallery, "Obsolete Dreams", Portland, OR
2009
 Backspace Gallery, "Air Superiority and Obsolete Dreams", Portland, OR
2008
 Light Gallery, "Fuck Yeah Bro!", Costa Mesa, CA
 Backspace Gallery, "Drop Out, Not Bombs", Portland, OR
 Fice, "Jesus I Trust in You", Salt Lake City, Ut.
2007
 Mark Wooley Gallery, "Affair at the Jupiter Hotel", Portland, OR
 The Closet, "Liar's Laughter", Santa Monica, CA

2006
 Sugar Gallery, "Seven Day Weekend", Portland, OR
 The Camp Gallery, "Key to the City". Costa Mesa, CA
 Backspace Gallery, "It's Not Gay If It's For Drugs", Portland, OR
 Rake Art Gallery, "Ultra Artsy", Portland, OR
 Seven Gallery, "Let the Good Times Roll", Portland, OR
2005
 Neverender Gallery, "Zerocharisma", Reno, NV
 Circle Gallery, "Zerocharisma", Salt Lake City, UT
 Nemo Design, "Looking Good is Better Than Feeling Good", Portland, OR
 Backspace Gallery, "Zerocharisma", Portland, OR
2004
 Street Machine Gallery, "Nice Life", San Diego, CA
 Backspace Gallery, "Nice Life", Portland, OR

2003
 KCDC Gallery, "Nice Life", Williamsburg, NY

See also

 Skateboarding Culture

References

External links

Interviews
 
 
 
 
 
 

1977 births
American contemporary artists
Artists from California
Living people
Pacific Northwest College of Art alumni